The Dayton Electric was an American electric car manufactured in Dayton, Ohio, from 1911 until 1915; the company offered a complex range of vehicles.

See also
List of defunct United States automobile manufacturers
History of the electric vehicle
Apple, an early Dayton area automobile manufacturer

Other Early Electric Vehicles
American Electric 
Argo Electric
Babcock Electric Carriage Company
Baker Electric
Berwick
Binghamton Electric
Buffalo Electric
Century
Columbia Automobile Company
Detroit Electric
Grinnell
Owen Magnetic
Rauch and Lang
Riker Electric
Woods Motor Vehicle

References

Defunct motor vehicle manufacturers of the United States
Defunct companies based in Dayton, Ohio
Motor vehicle manufacturers based in Ohio